The Giant Sequoia National Monument is a  U.S. National Monument located in the southern Sierra Nevada in eastern central California.

The monument is in two sections. The northern section surrounds General Grant Grove and other parts of Kings Canyon National Park and is administered by the Hume Lake Ranger District. The southern section, which includes Long Meadow Grove, is directly south of Sequoia National Park and is administered by the Western Divide Ranger District, surrounding the eastern half of the Tule River Indian Reservation.

Management

Presidential Proclamation 7295 required that a management plan be completed within three years. In January 2004, the Sequoia National Forest published and began implementation of the Giant Sequoia National Monument Management Plan, which provided for use by an international public as well as for the protection and restoration of 33 giant sequoia groves and their ecosystems. Subsequently, two lawsuits were brought challenging the plan. In October 2006, Federal District Court Judge Charles Breyer found in favor of the plaintiffs and remanded the plan to the U.S. Forest Service "…so that a proper Monument Plan can be developed in accordance with the Presidential Proclamation,… and in compliance with the National Environmental Policy Act (NEPA)…"

In January 2008, the Sequoia National Forest published a notice of intent in the Federal Register that they intended to prepare an environmental impact statement and were beginning a year-long collaborative scoping process for development of a new Giant Sequoia National Monument Management Plan.

 only one location in the monument, the Generals Highway, is listed on the National Register of Historic Places, but the monument does have several hundred sites that are potentially eligible for the register.

See also
Converse Basin Grove
Ecology of the Sierra Nevada
List of giant sequoia groves
List of largest giant sequoias
List of plants of the Sierra Nevada (U.S.)
List of national monuments of the United States
Protected areas of the Sierra Nevada
Fauna of the Sierra Nevada
Flora of the Sierra Nevada

References

External links

Sequoia National Forest: Photo Gallery — one of several Giant Sequoia groves within the monument
USFS: Sequoia National Forest and Giant Sequoia National Monument homepage
Sequoia National Forest: Overview, Creation, and Administration of the Monument
 Trail of 100 Giants

 
Giant sequoia groves
National Monuments in California
Parks in Fresno County, California
Parks in Kern County, California
Parks in Tulare County, California
Protected areas of the Sierra Nevada (United States)
Sequoia National Forest
Giant Sequoia
Sequoiadendron
2000 establishments in California
Protected areas established in 2000